Pronola diffusa is a moth in the subfamily Arctiinae. It was described by Schaus in 1899. It is found in Peru.

References

Moths described in 1899
Lithosiini